Vaidyanatha or Vaidyanath is usually a form of Jyotirlinga, see Vaidyanath Jyotirlinga. 

Vaidyanatha is a given name of some shaivites in India:

 A. Vaidyanatha Iyer (1890–1955), an Indian activist, politician and freedom-fighter
 Chembai Vaidyanatha Bhagavatar, a musicologist.
 Vaidyanatha Dikshita, a Sanskrit author of 14th century.
 Vaidyanath Mishra (1911–1998), better known by his pen name Nagarjun, was a Hindi and Maithili poet 

Masculine given names